Warszawa Dawidy railway station is a railway station in the Ursynów district of Warsaw, Poland. It is served by Koleje Mazowieckie, which runs services from Warszawa Wschodnia to Góra Kalwaria and Skarżysko-Kamienna.

References
Station article at kolej.one.pl

External links

Dawidy
Railway stations served by Koleje Mazowieckie